This is a list of National Basketball Association team presidents.

Key

List 

 Notes

 An asterisk (*) following 'Date of Hire' denotes Head of Basketball Operations. See the respective team articles for more information.

See also 

 NBA Executive of the Year Award
 List of NBA team owners
 List of National Basketball Association general managers
 List of current National Basketball Association head coaches
 List of National Basketball Association head coaches
 List of current National Basketball Association broadcasters
 :Category:National Basketball Association team presidents
 :Category:National Basketball Association executives

References 

National Basketball Association lists